Claire Barnett-Jones (born 1990) is a British mezzo-soprano. She was a finalist and won the Dame Joan Sutherland Audience Prize at the 2021 BBC Cardiff Singer of the World Competition. She is the Sir John Tomlinson Fellow at English National Opera, a Samling Artist Britten Pears Artist and Independent Opera Fellow.

Early life 
Claire Barnett-Jones was born in Taunton, Somerset, and is the eldest of 4 children. Her father was a police officer and neither of her parents was particularly musical. She attended local comprehensive schools (The Castle School and Richard Huish College) where she was part of local authority music initiatives, learning the violin/viola and later on the Saxophone and Clarinet. She was the Principal Violist of the National Children’s Orchestra and Somerset County Youth Orchestra, and sang in Female Barbershop Choruses She did not start singing lessons until the age of 17.

Career 
Barnett-Jones studied at Royal Academy of Music for Masters and Opera School, the Guildhall School of Music and Drama for an Artist Diploma, and the Royal Birmingham Conservatoire for her Bachelors.

During her undergraduate studies she debuted at the BBC Proms in Stockhausen’s ‘Mittwoch aus Licht’  with ExCathedra.

She is a Harewood Artist at English National Opera,  and she made her debut in October 2019 as a last minute replacement in Harrison Birtwistle’s The Mask of Orpheus, directed by Daniel Kramer, conducted by Martyn Brabbins and with Costume design by Daniel Lismore. Prior to working at ENO she was a chorister at Glyndebourne Festival Opera, understudying the roles of Suzuki in Madama Butterfly, Annina in Der Rosenkavalier and Dryad in Ariadne auf Naxos. She went on to sing Annina in La Traviata for Glyndebourne on Tour.

During the Pandemic Year of 2020, even with many cancellations, Barnett-Jones made her debuts with The Grange Festival in ‘Precipice’ and her European Debut as Madame Flora in Menotti’s The Medium at Oper Frankfurt Conducted by Sebastian Wiegle and Directed by Hans Walter Richter.

In 2021 she competed in BBC Cardiff Singer of the World at less than 12 hours notice, when singer had to quarantine in line with COVID guidelines at the time. She went on to win her Round and competed in the Final, winning the Dame Joan Sutherland Audience Prize.

Barnett-Jones has recorded with the BBC Philharmonic Orchestra, London Philharmonic Orchestra, Royal Scottish National Orchestra, City of Birmingham Symphony Orchestra, The Academy of Ancient Music, The Royal Concertgebouw Orchestra, BBC Symphony Orchestra and at The Wigmore Hall.

Awards 

 Elizabeth Connell Prize for Dramatic Soprano’s and Mezzo’s 2021
 Dame Joan Sutherland Audience Prize and Finalist at BBC Cardiff Singer of the World 2021
 Lilian Baylis Award from English National Opera for Outstanding Potential in Opera 2019
 The Grange Festival Opera International Singer Competition 2nd Prize, Villa Medici Prize and Waynflete Singers Prize 2019
 Operalia 2019
 Wagner Prize of the Netherlands, Junior Jury Prize and Finalist at International Vocal Competition s’Hertogenbosch 2017
 Glyndebourne Festival Opera Wessex Glyndebourne Association Award 2017
 Dame Patricia Routledge English Song Prize 2016

Personal life 
Barnett-Jones is Dyslexic. She currently lives in London with her fellow opera singing partner and their Calico Rescue Cat.

References

External links 
 Claire Barnett-Jones - Website
 Agent’s Website

British opera singers
1990 births
Living people
People with dyslexia